The 2006 Capital One Bowl was a post-season college football bowl game between the Wisconsin Badgers and the Auburn Tigers on January 2, 2006, at the Citrus Bowl in Orlando, Florida. Despite the odds against them, Wisconsin defeated the higher ranked Tigers, 24-10.

Prior to the bowl game, Barry Alvarez announced that he would be stepping down as head coach of Wisconsin after 16 seasons and eight bowl victories in order to focus his attention on his duties as the athletic director at the University.

Brian Calhoun, the MVP of the game, rushed 30 times for 213 yards and a 33-yard touchdown in the fourth quarter to seal the game for the Badgers. This would turn out to be his last collegiate football game as Calhoun opted to forgo his senior year in favor of entering the NFL Draft. Badgers QB John Stocco threw for 301 yards and two touchdowns. Wisconsin wide receiver Brandon Williams caught six passes for 173 yards and a touchdown in addition to 35 yards rushing.

Despite having the top offense in the Southeastern Conference, Auburn was not able to establish themselves against the Badgers defense. In the 2005 season, Auburn had not been shut out in the first half. Overall, Auburn's offense was outgained by Wisconsin by over two to one.

Statistics

Scoring summary

References

Capital One Bowl
Citrus Bowl (game)
Auburn Tigers football bowl games
Wisconsin Badgers football bowl games
Capital One Bowl
Capital One Bowl